The Gypsy Queens is a French pop band formed in Nice by Didier Casnati. They play a large repertoire of multi-lingual covers, with a rich vocal style likened to bands such as The Beach Boys or The Beatles.

Although the band successfully released albums in 2012 and 2014 they are first and foremost a performing band, typically playing at over 200 private events a year. They were "discovered" by the likes of Sir Elton John and Nicolas Sarkozy and have been mainstays of the private party circuit of the rich and famous ever since. Founder Didier Casnati claims "we are the most famous band you have never heard of".

History

2007–2011: Formation and covers
In 2007, Italian singer Didier Casnati broke his duo with Philip Jones after seven years and formed The Gypsy Queens with another five members. The band play an international repertoire of acoustic pop cover versions, and all members sing, giving them a style which reviewers liken to The Beach Boys and The Beatles. They played the role of The Plastic People of the Universe in the Tom Stoppard play Rock 'n' Roll, from 26 September 2008, to 23 October 2008, in the Theatre National de Nice. In 2011, Casnati saw a decline in the local clientele of the band, and managed to get an article in an airline magazine in order to restore the business for the band in the south of France; that article led to singing with London Records and Universal Music Group.

2012–present: Music releases and private party circuits
The band recorded The Gypsy Queens with record producer Larry Klein (who has worked with Joni Mitchell, Herbie Hancock and Madeleine Peyroux) in Los Angeles, California, in April 2012. The album includes the songs "L'Americano", "Aicha", "Ventura Highway" and "Marrakesh Express".  It features vocals from Madeleine Peyroux, Graham Nash, Gerry Beckley and Dewey Bunnell, as well as piano by Booker T. Jones. The album was released 2 November 2012 and debuted at number 46 in the UK Albums Chart. Their second single "l'Italiano", featuring James Bond Casino Royale Actress Caterina Murino was an international success, achieving several million views on YouTube, in just a couple of weeks. They performed at Glastonbury Festival and Isle of Wight Festival. At this time, they performed at private parties and events notable public figures as Nicolas Sarkozy, Bono, Janet Jackson, Serena Williams, Prince William and Prince Harry, Giorgio Armani, Elton John, Rod Stewart, Kevin Spacey, Robert de Niro and David and Victoria Beckham.

After the success of their first album, the band recorded Lost in the Music (Sonico Productions Ltd). Produced by lead singer Didier Casnati, it was recorded in London's famous RAK Studios, and finalised in Los Angeles. The album includes the songs "Do you St. Tropez", "Losing myself in the music", "Sunny" and "Parole, Parole".  It features vocals from Ben Taylor, and Hayley Westenra, and was mixed by multiple Grammy-winning sound engineer Helik Hadar. The band themselves describe the albums as an "expensive but necessary business card". In 2019, The Gypsy Queens performed for billionaire Harry Macklowe's wedding to Patricia Landeau and David Lee's wedding to Caroline Wozniacki

In February 2020, The Gypsy Queens recorded 2 singles with record producer Larry Klein at The Village in Los Angeles, "I'm into Something Good", featuring Herman's Hermits Peter Noone who originally made the song famous in 1965, and Buona Sera, as part as the Album "Reminiscing with friends" (Sonico Productions Ltd 2022).
The cover of the single was photographed by iconic Photographer Marco Glaviano in Saint Barthélemy

In 2022, their single "L'Americano" was featured in the Netflix Movie "Love in the villa", directed by Mark Steven Johnson, and starring Kat Graham and Tom Hopper.

Discography

Studio albums

Singles

Members
Didier Casnati – Lead vocals 
Alberto Laurella – Double bass 
Sam Houghton – Saxophone 
Juan Francisco Rey Toro – Drums 
Joseph Hamblin Boone – Guitar 

Former members
Manuel Polin – Drums  
Jason King – Double bass 
Jay Metcalf – Saxophone 
David Zincke – Guitar 
Anders Klunderud – Guitar 
Fred Novelli – Double bass 
Jack Kane – Saxophone 
Jeremy Kola – Guitar 
Jeremy Trabucco – Drums 
Miguel Bosch – Guitar 

Timeline

Awards and nominations

References

External links
 , the band's official website

Other links
https://www.standard.co.uk/go/london/music/gypsy-queens-streetsmart-fortnum-and-mason-a4020346.html
http://www.nogarlicnoonions.com/la-petite-maison-celebrates-with-the-gypsy-queens/
http://busk.co/blog/2012/12/interview-with-the-gypsy-queens/
http://www.gettyimages.com/detail/news-photo/the-gypsy-queens-attend-the-f1-party-in-aid-of-the-great-news-photo/451620500
http://aishtiblog.com/gypsy-queens-say/
http://www.express.co.uk/entertainment/music/363112/CD-Review-The-Gypsy-Queens-The-Gypsy-Queens
http://partisanpr.com/2012/08/the-gypsy-queens-play-madame-jojos-20th-sept/
http://www.irishtimes.com/culture/music/album-reviews/the-gypsy-queens-1.5303
http://www.timeout.com/london/cabaret/the-gypsy-queens
http://edinburgh-reviews.co.uk/the-gypsy-queens-busking-on-princess-street-to-support-sick-kids/
http://www.thwaites.com/our-customers/the-gypsy-queens/
http://www.theedinburghreporter.co.uk/2012/10/the-gypsy-queens-made-a-video-for-us/
http://www.universal-music.de/the-gypsy-queens/home
http://irish-charts.com/showitem.asp?interpret=The+Gypsy+Queens&titel=The+Gypsy+Queens&cat=a

Musical groups with year of establishment missing
2000 establishments in France
French pop music groups
Musical groups established in the 2000s
Musical quintets
Organizations based in Nice
Universal Music Group artists
Musical groups from Provence-Alpes-Côte d'Azur